The men's hammer throw at the 2000 Summer Olympics as part of the athletics program was held at the ANZ Stadium on Saturday, 23 September and Sunday, 24 September. There were 44 competitors from 24 nations. The event was won by Szymon Ziółkowski of Poland, the nation's first victory in the event and first medal of any color in the men's hammer throw since 1960. Silver went to Nicola Vizzoni, the first medal winner in the event for Italy. Igor Astapkovich, who had won a silver medal on the Unified Team in 1992, took bronze for the first medal credited to Belarus in the event. Astapkovich was the 11th man to win multiple medals in the hammer throw.

Background

This was the 23rd appearance of the event, which has been held at every Summer Olympics except 1896. Seven of the 12 finalists from the 1996 Games returned: silver medalist (and 1992 finalist) Lance Deal of the United States, fourth-place finisher Andriy Skvaruk of Ukraine, fifth-place finisher (and 1988 and 1992 finalist) Heinz Weis of Germany, sixth-place finisher Ilya Konovalov of Russia, seventh-place finisher (and 1992 silver medalist) Igor Astapkovich of Belarus, tenth-place finisher Szymon Ziółkowski of Poland, and twelfth-place finisher Vasiliy Sidorenko of Russia. Also returning was 1992 Olympic champion Andrey Abduvaliyev, now competing for Uzbekistan. Weis (1997) and Karsten Kobs (199), also of Germany, were the last two World Champions.

Croatia, Kyrgyzstan, Moldova, Slovakia, and Slovenia each made their debut in the event. The United States appeared for the 22nd time, most of any nation, having missed only the boycotted 1980 Games.

Qualification

Each National Olympic Committee was permitted to enter up to three athletes that had thrown 75.50 metres or further during the qualification period. The maximum number of athletes per nation had been set at 3 since the 1930 Olympic Congress. If an NOC had no athletes that qualified under that standard, one athlete that had thrown 72.50 metres or further could be entered.

Competition format

The competition used the two-round format introduced in 1936, with the qualifying round completely separate from the divided final. In qualifying, each athlete received three attempts; those recording a mark of at least 77.50 metres advanced to the final. If fewer than 12 athletes achieved that distance, the top 12 would advance. The results of the qualifying round were then ignored. Finalists received three throws each, with the top eight competitors receiving an additional three attempts. The best distance among those six throws counted.

Records

Prior to the competition, the existing world and Olympic records were as follows.

No new world or Olympic records were set during the competition.

Schedule

All times are Australian Eastern Standard Time (UTC+10)

Results

Qualifying

Final

The tie for bronze medal at 79.17 metres was broken by second-best throw, with Astapkovich's 79.06 metres beating Tikhon's 78.85 metres.

See also
 2000 Hammer Throw Year Ranking

References

External links
  Official Report
  todor66
  hammerthrow.wz

J
Hammer throw at the Olympics
Men's events at the 2000 Summer Olympics